The Camera & the Song is a compilation album composed of songs by various folk bands and artists like Fivepenny Piece or Tír na nÓg from the BBC Two television series The Camera & the Song. The songs were broadcast in the early 1970s and this LP  released in 1975.

Track listing

Side One 
 "Mountain Climber" (John Meeks, Colin Radcliffe) - Fivepenny Piece
 "Boat Song" (Leo O'Kelly) - Tír na nÓg, credited to Leo O'Kelly & Sonny Condell
 "Paradise Flats" (Alex Glasgow) - Alex Glasgow
 "Michael in the Garden" (Ralph McTell) - Ralph McTell
 "The Apprentice's Song" (Ian Campbell) - The Ian Campbell Folk Group
 "Duw It's Hard" (Max Boyce) - Max Boyce

Side Two 
 "Backbreaker" (John Gorman, Roger McGough, Neil Innes, Andy Roberts, Dave Richards, John Megginson) - Grimms
 "Two White Horses" (Sonny Condell) - Tír na nÓg, credited to Leo O'Kelly & Sonny Condell
 "All in a Day" (Glasgow) - Alex Glasgow
 "For My Father" (Harvey Andrews) - Harvey Andrews
 "Country Bus" (Jake Thackray) - Jake Thackray
 "Blackpool" (Jeremy Taylor) - Jeremy Taylor

Release history

References

1975 compilation albums
Folk compilation albums